Oneeleng Radikara is a Botswanan former footballer. A defender, he won one cap for the Botswana national football team, entering in the 60th minute of a 2–1 loss to South Africa at the COSAFA Cup on 20 February 1999.

See also
Football in Botswana

References

External links

Living people
Association football defenders
Botswana footballers
Botswana international footballers
Year of birth missing (living people)